Benbow is an unincorporated community in Marion County, in the U.S. state of Missouri.

History
Benbow was originally called Midway, and under the latter name was laid out in 1862. A post office called Benbow was established in 1865, and remained in operation until 1906. The identity of namesake Benbow has been lost.

References

Unincorporated communities in Marion County, Missouri
Unincorporated communities in Missouri